Coppell is a city in the northwest corner of Dallas County in the U.S. state of Texas. It is a suburb of Dallas and a bedroom community in the Dallas–Fort Worth metroplex. Its population was 42,983 at the 2020 census.  A small area in the far northern portion of the city extends into neighboring Denton County.

History
The Coppell area was settled by German and French immigrants in the 1840s. Members of the Peters Colony also settled here in the 1840s. Originally named Gibbs Station, after Barnett Gibbs (one of Texas's first lieutenant governors), the town was renamed in 1892 for George Coppell, a wealthy English financier, who came to the United States in the 1880s, and was reportedly heavily involved with the final construction of the local railroad line. Popular belief is that he was an engineer, but little or no evidence supports that claim.

In 1955, the community was incorporated through a ballot measure that passed by a vote of 41 to 1. Spurred by the opening of Dallas/Fort Worth International Airport (DFW Airport) in 1974, the city was radically transformed from a tiny farming village to a large, upper-middle class suburban community in the 1980s and 1990s. By 2000, almost all of the residentially zoned land in the city was developed, and the population grew to over 35,000. In addition to suburban homes, the city has a growing commercial base of warehouses and transportation centers on the south and west sides of the city, closest in proximity to the airport.

Geography
Coppell is located at  (32.967341, −96.986564).

Coppell occupies the northwest corner of Dallas County and lies in proximity to DFW Airport. A portion of the airport property is within the city limits of Coppell.  It is bordered on the west by Grapevine, on the north by Lewisville, on the east by Carrollton, and on the south by Irving and Dallas.

Demographics

As of the 2020 United States census, there were 42,983 people, 15,231 households, and 12,178 families residing in the city. As of the census data estimates for 2019,  41,645 people, 15,538 households, and 12,155 families were residing in the city.  The population density was 2,827.2 people per square mile (1,091.6/km2). There are 16,002 housing units averaged 1,086.3 per mi2 (419.4/km2). The racial makeup of the city was 67.1% White, 4.2% African American, 0.2% Native American, 24.4% Asian,  0.8% from other races, and 3.2% from two or more races. Hispanics or Latinos of any race were 13.1% of the population.

Of the 15,538 households, 44.1% had children under the age of 18 living with them, 65.0% were married couples living together, 3.0% were widowed, 9.0% were divorced, 0.9% were separated, and 22.0% were single. About 20.1% of all households were made up of individuals, and 5.1% had someone living alone who was 65 years of age or older. The average household size was 2.2.68, and the average family size was 3.09.

In the city, the age distribution was 27.0% under the age of 18, 4.9% from 18 to 24, 35.9% from 25 to 44, 34.7% from 45 to 64, and 9.0% who were 65 years of age or older. The median age was 40.5 years. For every 100 females, there were 92.6 males.

According to a 2019 estimate, the median income for a household in the city was $122,340, and for a family was $141,867. Males had a median income of $87,484 versus $46,038 for females. The per capita income for the city was $41,645. About 2.1% of families and 2.6% of the population were below the poverty line, including 3.7% of those under age 18 and 2.3% of those age 65 or over. In 2020, the city was ranked as the 10th most affluent city in Texas.

Economy

Coppell's economy relies largely on its proximity to DFW Airport, which is directly to its southwest and accessible by several highways and surface routes. As such, many corporations have shipping and distribution facilities in a large commercial zone comprising the southwestern section of the city, among them Amazon, Avaya, Nokia, IBM, The Container Store, Uline and Mohawk Industries. In March 2010, Samsung opened a new cell-phone manufacturing and distribution facility in the city. Anime distributor Funimation (now branded as Crunchyroll) moved to the new Cypress Waters development on Olympus Boulevard in late 2021.

Sports
Coppell is home to the gymnastics club Texas Dreams Gymnastics. The club has coached Peyton Ernst and Bailie Key and has a strong team of upcoming level 10 gymnasts. The head coach is former Olympian, and the first American "All Around" World Champion Gold Medalist 1991, Kim Zmeskal Burdette.

Education
Coppell residents are served by one of four school districts.

Coppell Independent School District (CISD) is responsible for the kindergarten–grade 12 education of the majority of the City of Coppell's children. A portion of the CISD also covers parts of north Irving in the Valley Ranch area and those portions of Lewisville that fall south of the current Dallas/Denton County boundary. Its high schools are Coppell High School and the more recently opened New Tech High.

Carrollton-Farmers Branch ISD serves easternmost Coppell, south of Sandy Lake Rd. and to the east of Macarthur Blvd., including the Riverchase area, and students matriculate to Barbara Bush Middle School and Ranchview High School in Irving. A portion of Coppell in Dallas County is within Grapevine-Colleyville Independent School District.

Lewisville ISD serves the northernmost section of Coppell falling in Denton County, including the Coppell Greens subdivision. This area is north of State Highway 121.

All of the elementary schools in the Coppell Independent School District are rated "exemplary" by the Texas Education Agency (in 2008), as are Coppell Middle School North and Coppell Middle School East.  Coppell Middle School West, Coppell High School, and the district as a whole are rated "recognized".  New Tech High received an "exemplary" ranking in its first year, the 2008–2009 school year. Riverchase Elementary (in the Carrollton-Farmers Branch Independent School District, but located in Coppell) is rated "recognized".  Students from that school go on to attend the Barbara Bush Middle School and Ranchview High School in neighboring Valley Ranch.  They are rated "academically acceptable" and "recognized", respectively.

The Coppell ISD was ranked as the top music program in the United States by the Music Educators Association in 2000. In August 2001, Coppell voters approved a sales tax increase to provide funding for arts in the school district.  The Coppell High School Marching Band won the Texas 4A UIL championship in 1999 and finished third in 5A in 2009.  The Coppell Middle School North Band won the Texas state championship in 2006, 2011, and 2016.  The Coppell Middle School East band finished fourth in state in 2011.

Coppell High School's news program, KCBY-TV, has won several national awards for their work with video production. The KCBY broadcast department features local stories reaching out to the community in the school, as well as the community outside of school. The KCBY sports department offers a live broadcast of all of the athletic home games. The Head of KCBY is Irma Kennedy, who had worked with NBC prior to taking the job. In the summer of 2010, KCBY got an estimated $500,000 worth of new equipment, as it prepared to take on the challenges of a live broadcast in spring 2011. The news program also features a movie-related segment every week featuring new upcoming movies and more.

New Tech High's film program, NT Fuze, has had several of its productions accepted to major film festivals, including South by Southwest and the Dallas International Film Festival. NT Fuze provides students a chance to learn the art of filmmaking and use the latest production tools. NT Fuze produces quality content not only for New Tech and Coppell ISD, but also for local businesses and organizations.

Transportation
Coppell is next to the northeast corner of DFW Airport. No freeways go directly through the city, but the entire perimeter is served by SH121 and the Sam Rayburn Tollway (west and north), Interstate 635 (south), and the President George Bush Turnpike and Interstate 35E (east).

Coppell has no public transportation; it was a charter member of Dallas Area Rapid Transit (DART), but voters elected to withdraw from DART in 1989. This election remains controversial today, as the city had a much smaller population in the 1980s, and the lack of membership in DART likely prevents the city from participating in the planned Silver Line commuter rail system. Since Coppell borders DART member cities Carrollton, Dallas, and Irving, it can rejoin at a later date if it wishes, provided that it can assess the mandatory 1% sales tax. The future Cypress Waters station in Coppell is expected to be served by the Silver Line.

Notable people 

 Ashley Cain, two-time U.S. figure skating pairs champion
 Kim Chung-ha, Korean solo artist, former member of K-pop girl group I.O.I
 Kelli Finglass, director of the Dallas Cowboys Cheerleaders
 Laura Gao (cartoonist, author of Messy Roots) 
 Veronica Hults, former national gymnast
 Corey Kluber, two-time Cy Young Award winner, pitcher for the Tampa Bay Rays, former pitcher for the New York Yankees
 Chiaka Ogbogu, professional volleyball player, gold medalist in women's indoor volleyball at the 2020 Summer Olympics
 Bennett Ratliff, member of the Texas House of Representatives from Coppell (2013–2015)
 Keri Russell, television and film actress
 Solomon Thomas, defensive tackle for the Las Vegas Raiders
 Connor Williams, offensive lineman for the Miami Dolphins

References

External links
 City site
 Coppell Historical Society

 
Dallas–Fort Worth metroplex
Cities in Texas
Cities in Dallas County, Texas
Cities in Denton County, Texas
Populated places established in 1955
1955 establishments in Texas